Elden may refer to:

 Elden Racing Cars, a British company
 Elden, Netherlands, a village near Arnhem
 Elden (name), given name and surname
 Mount Elden, a mountain near Flagstaff, Arizona
 Elden, Yeşilova, Turkey
 Elden, Orta

See also
 Eldin (disambiguation)
 Eldon (disambiguation)